Luís Pedro (born 27 April 1990) is a Dutch professional footballer who plays as a winger for SV TEC in the Dutch Tweede Divisie. He has also played club football in the Netherlands, Bulgaria, Romania, and England.

Career

Club career
Born in Luanda, Angola, Pedro began his career with MVV Maastricht and moved to Feyenoord in 2006. He was the top goalscorer for the reserve team in the 2007–08 season. Pedro spent the 2009–10 season on loan at SBV Excelsior.

After first relocating to Bulgaria in 2013 to play for Botev Plovdiv, he signed a two-year contract with Levski Sofia in July 2014.

Pedro joined Carlisle United on 24 March 2016 until the end of the 2015–16 season. After being part of the ranks of MVV Maastricht, in June 2017 Pedro signed a contract with FC Volendam for one season (with the option for an additional one).

International career
Pedro is a youth player for Netherlands having represented them at under-18 and under-19 levels.

Personal life
Pedro is son of a Portuguese father and an Angolan mother, although he holds a Dutch passport.

Honours

Club
ASA Târgu Mureș
Romanian Supercup: 2015

References

External links
 Voetbal International 
 

1990 births
Living people
Footballers from Luanda
Dutch footballers
Dutch expatriate footballers
Netherlands youth international footballers
Angolan footballers
Dutch people of Portuguese descent
Dutch people of Angolan descent
Angolan people of Portuguese descent
Angolan emigrants to the Netherlands
Association football forwards
Feyenoord players
Excelsior Rotterdam players
Go Ahead Eagles players
Heracles Almelo players
Botev Plovdiv players
PFC Levski Sofia players
ASA 2013 Târgu Mureș players
Carlisle United F.C. players
MVV Maastricht players
FC Volendam players
FC Lienden players
SV TEC players
Eredivisie players
Eerste Divisie players
Tweede Divisie players
First Professional Football League (Bulgaria) players
Liga I players
Expatriate footballers in Bulgaria
Expatriate footballers in Romania